The Count of the Old Town is a 1935 Swedish comedy film directed by Edvin Adolphson and Sigurd Wallén, both of whom had major roles in the film.  It was Ingrid Bergman's film debut.

Plot summary

Cast
Valdemar Dalquist as Greven (as Waldemar Dalquist)
 Julia Cæsar as Klara (as Julia Caesar)
 Sigurd Wallén as Gurkan
 Tollie Zellman as Amalia
 Edvin Adolphson as Åke
 Ingrid Bergman as Elsa
 Eric Abrahamsson as Borstis (as Eric Abrahamson)
 Weyler Hildebrand as Göransson

References

External links
 
 
 
 

1935 films
1935 comedy films
Swedish comedy films
1930s Swedish-language films
Swedish black-and-white films
Films directed by Sigurd Wallén
Films directed by Edvin Adolphson
1930s Swedish films